Tura (IPA: ˈtʊərə) is a municipality in the West Garo Hills district of the Indian state of Meghalaya. One of the largest towns in Meghalaya, Tura is located in the foothills of the Tura range of the Garo Hills. Before the British came to the Garo Hills, Tura was known as Dura and the British called the place, Tura as it was easier for them to pronounce the name. The climate in Tura is moderate throughout the year and has many interesting and unexplored areas. The native god Durama was believed to reside in the hills.

It is 220 kilometres from the nearest city Guwahati and is also the district headquarter of the West Garo Hills district. It is filled with small rivulets and green valleys all around. The principal languages are Garo and English. The city has four colleges and multiple secondary schools. In 1973, the town was made the seat of the Roman Catholic Diocese of Tura.

The capital city of Shillong is 323 kilometres away and can be accessed via buses or the shuttle helicopter service. The border of Bangladesh Dalu, is situated at a proximity of 50 km.

Tura is a cultural and administrative centre of the Garo tribe. To visit popular tourist destinations such as Balpakram, Nokrek and Siju Cave Chitmang Peak, one needs to pass through this town.

There are many water falls and lot of streams in Tura. Some of the water falls are Rongbangdare, Pelgadare, Gandrak Falls etc. Some of the streams are Rangolwari, Nokmawari, Ganol, and Dachima.

Geography and climate
It has an average elevation of 349 metres (1145 feet). Its climate is a Humid Subtropical climate (Köppen climate classification: Cwa).

Demographics

The population of Tura city is 74,858 according to the 2011 census. The indigenous Garo people form the majority of Tura's population, which also includes Hajong people, Bengalis, Nepalis, Koches, Rabhas, Bodos, and other indigenous tribal ethnic groups along with immigrant Muslims and Biharis. The population of Garo people in Tura city is 54,750, making up 73% of the city population. 
As of the 2011 Census of India, Tura had a population of 58,391. Males constitute 51% of the population and females 49%. Tura has an average literacy rate of 70%, higher than the national average of 56%: male literacy is 70%, and female literacy is 67%. In Tura, 14% of the population is under 6 years of age.

Language

Garo is Spoken by 54,575 people, Bengali by 12,113, Hindi by 3,563, Nepali by 1,609 and 11,911 people speaks other languages.

Connectivity
Tura is situated in the western part of Meghalaya which is quite close to the National Border of Bangladesh. The main mode of transport is by road, as there are no railways or any scheduled flights from nearby Baljek Airport. From Guwahati, it is 220 km, through the National Highway 217(Old NH 51). Day time Sumo and overnight bus services are available from Guwahati. There is a 3-days-a-week helicopter service available from Guwahati and Shillong, run by Pawan Hans.

Society
Main Residents of Tura are the Garo tribe (Native People). Christianity is the main religion, Almost 100% of the Garos are Christians. There are different Christian denominations like Baptist, Catholic, Seventh Day Adventist, Church of Jesus Christ (COJC), Christian Revival Church (CRC) etc. The Garos have a matrilineal society.

Apart from the Garos, Tura also hosts a variety of other tribes like Hajongs, Koches, Rabhas, Bodos and other indigenous Assamese communities who are Hindu by religion. There are also a considerable number of immigrant Bengali, Bihari and Nepali speaking community etc as well.

Transport
By Air nearest airport is Guwahati Airport (GAU), Bus, Hire Cab. Although Tura has its own airport named Baljek airport situated approx. 30 km from the town but it's not yet functioning. It was inaugurated by then President of India Smt. Pratibha Patil during her visit to the town.

Education

Colleges and Universities
 College of Home Science (under Central Agricultural University, Imphal)
 College of Teacher Education
 Don Bosco College, Tura
 Durama College
 Harding Theological College
 ICFAI University Meghalaya, Tura
 Martin Luther University, Tura Campus
 North-Eastern Hill University, Tura Campus.
 Tura College of Information Technology
 Tura Govt. College
 Tura Law College
 Tura Polytechnic.
 Tura United Christian Academy.

Other institutes
 National Skill Training Institute for Women
 Tura Industrial Training Institute
Food Craft Institute, Tura under NCHMCT, Noida.

Food and drinks

There are many varieties of food available, the common one is the traditional Garo food. Traditional Garo food includes boiled rice, different preparations of pork, beef, chicken and dry fish. Some of the delicacies of Garo Food are Na·kam Bitchi (it is dry fish curry made with chillies and soda), Gal•da Matchu (Roselle leaves boiled with beef), Wak Gominda (it is Pumpkin cooked with Pork, chillies and soda) Wak Pura (it is pork cooked with crushed rice or rice flour), Khappa (meat fried with soda and boiled with fresh garden spices) Ta'a wakgran (Yam with smoked Pork, chillies and soda), Brenga (Meat cooked inside the bamboo), We'tepa (Meat/Fish/vegetables cooked wrapped in banana leaves), Chambil Wak Pura (Pomelo cooked with Pork and crushed rice), Ta'a wak Haldi rasin (Pork cooked with yam, turmeric powder, chillies and onions), Kalai do'o (Black lentils cooked with Chicken), Me'a nakam (Bamboo shoot with dry fish), Me'a wak Pura (Bamboo Shoot with pork and rice flour) etc. The common delicacies are rice cakes called sakkin (made with locally grown sticky rice and sesame seed) and pitta (made with crushed sticky rice and jaggery), Jakkep (made with sticky rice flour and sesame seeds). There are many variety of locally made drinks. Minil bitchi or Mi bitchi (Rice Beer) (made of fermented sticky rice or normal rice) is one of the most common drink. In fact, there are various indigenous delicacies.

Media and communications
All India Radio has a local station in Tura which transmits various programs of mass interest. Recently, daily local newspapers viz., The Tura Times, Janera and Salantini Ku·rang has been disseminating the information to the whole region of Garo Hills and also to parts of Assam (esp. two districts Kamrup and Goalpara) where the areas are populated with Garo People.

Notable people
 P.A. Sangma Indian politician
 Zubeen Garg Indian singer, actor, director, producer and music director.

References 

 
Cities and towns in West Garo Hills district